Taiwan Television Enterprise, Ltd., commonly known as TTV and formerly known as Central Television and Voice of Taiwan, is the first terrestrial television station in the Republic of China (Taiwan). It was established on April 28, 1962, and started formally broadcasting later that year on October 10, 1962, as free-to-air. It is the first television company in Taiwan.

The station became home to many trailblazing and innovative shows at the time. Recently, the station enjoyed a resurgence in viewership when it inked a major contract with Sanlih E-Television to promote and air the latter's shows. TTV's pop idol dramas consistently rated high, although it sometimes went down or up depending on the storyline and the stars' appeal on these dramas.

Under media reform laws, TTV was tapped for privatization in 2007. Currently, the financial TV network Unique Satellite TV owns most of the stake of TTV.

Since 1962, TTV began some of the milestones that changed the landscape of TTV presenting the first Taiwanese-language TV serial as well as the first Mandarin drama anthology series. TTV presented the first costume drama serial "Cheng Ch'eng-kung" (1963) starring Ts'ao Chien as the title role. On September 7, 1969, after airing what would be one of its final major coverages, that of the Apollo XI landing in July, in monochrome, TTV transitioned to color.

Appearances

Logo history

Description
Since the beginning of TTV in 1962, the earliest known was a simple TV logo with the letters "TTV" in it; the two Ts striking with a thunderbolt and a small V on a blue-green-red background. It was used until 1990 when it was replaced by a circular disk with an angular triangle inside the logo forming a satellite dish. The 1990 logo was used until recently in July 2008 when the present logo was revised with the same design but the triangle itself moves upward.

Test card 
The testcard of TTV is PM5544.

Closing and opening times
"Closing time" is 100%. It closes at 4:50. But it announced in the schedule.

TTV
Open 167.8 hours a week (Mon 4:49-5:00)

Channels
 TTV Main Channel
 TTV News Channel
 TTV Finance
 TTV Variety (formerly TTV Family)
 TTV World (defunct; most of their programming sold to third-party broadcasters)

Broadcast platform
North America--Cloud Tech Media
Australia-----FetchTV (Australia)
Malaysia------ABNXcess
Singapore----mio TV

The TTV shows

TTV Mandarin Novels (臺視國語電視小說), the earliest TTV drama in Mandarin during the 1960s. It was the predecessor of today's Primetime drama serials that is now shown every night at 8 PM.

Star Showcase (羣星會), the earliest TTV variety show that lasted for 15 years from 1962 to 1977. It was revived in the early 1990s and again in 2002, but both of the newer versions lasted for less than six months.

Pentalight Talent Show (五燈獎), the longest TV talent show in Taiwan that lasted for 33 years from 1965 to 1998. Some of the popular singers in Taiwan started their careers in that said show.

Fu Pei-mei's Chinese Cooking Show (傅培梅時間), one of the earliest programs of TTV hosted by Fu Pei-mei (1931–2004) ran for 40 years (1962 to 2002).

Taiwanese Opera (楊麗花歌仔戲), a Taiwanese opera TV featuring Taiwanese opera singer Yang Li-hua, began showing in the early evening slot from 1962 to 1975 and again from 1979 to 1994 where she also produces her Taiwanese opera works. In 1994, the show presented "The Goddess of the Luo River (a.k.a. "Mystical Enchantress") was the first Taiwanese opera series to hit on the primetime slot at 8:00 PM. Then, a few series was produced sporadically from 1996 to 2003. The last one was "Ode to Its Successor" in 2003 where they earned an award in the 2004 Golden Bell Awards.

See also
 List of Taiwanese television series

References

External links

 TTV official website
 

 
Television stations in Taiwan
Chinese-language television stations
Television channels and stations established in 1962
1960s in Taiwanese television
Companies based in Taipei
Mass media in Taipei